Žarko Puhovski (born 15 December 1946) is a Croatian professor, political analyst, philosopher and intellectual, former president of the Croatian Helsinki Committee.

Biography
Puhovski was born in Zagreb on 15 December 1946. He was born to a Jewish mother although he has never been an active Jew. Puhovski became well-known public figure at a very early age, for almost a trivial reason: When he became the president of his gymnasium committee of the Alliance of Socialist Youth a directive arrived to revitalise the political work with more vivacious subjects. Having discovered an article on contraception in the magazine Der Spiegel bought by his grandma, Puhovski found it a suitably "vivacious" subject and has on the school youth conference in 1964, in front of 400 students and all the teachers read an essay titled Love, sex and contraception. Before the essay was read to the end, all the professors left the solemnly decked hall. After everything was over, Puhovski was expelled from the League of Communists of Croatia. Miko Tripalo, the newly elected secretary of the City Committee of the League of Communists called for him, and told him: "I also had adventures here and there, but I was never punished by the Party, not even by a reprimand! What have you, for god's sake, in this age managed to achieve that you're being expelled from the Party because of sex?". After Tripalo realised what happened, he did his best to whitewash the halo of martyr of Puhovski and the punishment has been canceled.

After studying physics for two years he heads for Germany, but returns in 1968 enrolling to the Faculty of Political Sciences. In December 1969 he was appointed as the editor-in-chief of the Omladinski tjednik ("Youth weekly"), taking only 4 months to be discharged. The newspapers he edited were banned for insulting the President of the Republic. It was in March 1970 that he published on the third page of the newspaper a critical introductory on the 10th assembly of the Central Committee of the Communists of Croatia, and on the last page he reprinted a text of the Ljubljana's periodical Delo. In the cinema shows schedule Delo has behind the title Filmske novosti - Tito u Tanzaniji ("Film news - Tito in Tanzania") brought a summary of film's plot, bu without the film's title. The summary went: Veliki boss sakupio je svoj tim - stručnjake za oružje, drogu i prostituciju - i krenuo u osvajanje svijeta. ("The great boss has gathered his team - experts for weapons, drug and the prostitution - and went to conquer the world"). Puhovski translated, magnified and published that text.

In 1971 he was a witness on the trial of Croatian student leaders (Dražen Budiša, Ivan Zvonimir Čičak). Twenty years later, in a charged nationalist atmosphere, Puhovski has been for this trial depicted as an "anti-Croat" and "traitor" of his colleagues. However, Budiša stated some time later that there was nothing contentious in the testimony of Puhovski, and according to the words of professor of Marxism at the Faculty of Philosophy Duško Čizmić Marović:
Puhovski told nothing that was not already known to the court before, he didn't charge us with some fabricated facts. He simply provided a lengthy account of his own, already known viewpoints... But I was shocked by this gesture of him: when he, in one moment, started to quote me by his memory, I interrupted him with words "I didn't say that!". In that moment Puhovski turned towards me - me who was on trial! - raised his hand asking me "Wanna bet?".

From 1973 Puhovski works as an assistant in the Institute for Philosophy at the University of Zagreb, and since 1975 he teaches political philosophy at the Faculty of Philosophy. As a professor he held guest lectures at the Universities of Berlin, Frankfurt, London, Brighton, Klagenfurt and Valencia. He is a member of The Ethikon Institute in Los Angeles. He is the scientific director of the European University Center for Peace Studies in Stadtschlaining, Austria.

He served as an editor in various periodicals: Ideje (1970–1973); Kulturni radnik (1971–1982); Praxis (1973–1975); Teka (1975); Filozofska istraživanja (1980–1986). He translated numerous books and studies from German and English, published about two hundred works in political philosophy, ethics, philosophy of culture, jurisprudence and social sciences. He is the co-founder of the first alternative Yugoslav political organisation UJDI (Udruženje za Jugoslavensku demokratsku inicijativu, "Association for Yugoslav Democratic Initiative") in 1988, and the Croatian Helsinki Committee (HHO) in 1993, of which he is president in the period 2000–2007. He was awarded with European Club of Rectors Extraordinary Award for Peace and against Xenophobia 1993.

Works
Some of his major works include:
 Interes i zajednica (1975)
 Kontekst kulture (1979)
 Povijest i revolucija (1980)
 Um i društvenost (1989)
 Socijalistička konstrukcija zbilje (1990)
 Leksikon temeljnih pojmova politike (1990)
 Politics and Economics of Transition (1993)

References

1946 births
Croatian human rights activists
Croatian Jews
Croatian pacifists
Croatian philosophers
Living people
Academic staff of the University of Zagreb